Ralph Johnson may refer to:

Sports
Ralph Johnson (basketball) (1921–2005), American professional basketball player
Ralph Johnson (footballer) (1922–2013), English footballer
Ralph Johnson (outfielder), American baseball player
Ralph Johnson (fencer) (born 1948), British fencer who competed at four Olympic Games

Others
Ralph Johnson (bishop) (1828–1911), Anglican bishop
Ralph Hudson Johnson (1933–1993), British neurologist
Ralph Johnson (philosopher) (born 1940), co-creator of the subject of Informal logic at the University of Windsor
Ralph H. Johnson (1949–1968), United States Marine awarded the Medal of Honor during the Vietnam War
, United States Navy Arleigh Burke class destroyer named for PFC Johnson
Ralph Johnson (musician) (born 1951), percussionist for R&B/soul band Earth, Wind, and Fire
Ralph C. Johnson (1953–2016), American politician
Ralph Johnson (computer scientist) (born 1955), computer science professor at the University of Illinois at Urbana-Champaign
Ralph Johnson (architect), Chicago-based architect

See also
Ralph Johnstone (1880–1910), early aviator
Ralph Johnstone (politician) (1914–2010), Canadian politician and farmer

Johnson, Ralph